Mamañawi (Quechua mama mother, madam; vein (or seam), ñawi eye, Hispanicized spelling Mamañahui) is a  mountain in the Andes of Peru, about  high. It is situated in the Puno Region, Lampa Province, Santa Lucía. Mamañawi lies northwest of the mountain Uturunqani and southeast of Pukapunchu.

References

Mountains of Puno Region
Mountains of Peru